Kordeh Deh is a village in Ab-e Garm Rural District of the Central District of Sareyn County, Ardabil province, Iran. At the 2006 census, its population was 833 in 175 households. The following census in 2011 counted 973 people in 279 households. The latest census in 2016 showed a population of 1,077 people in 321 households; it was the largest village in its rural district.

References 

Sareyn County

Towns and villages in Sareyn County

Populated places in Ardabil Province

Populated places in Sareyn County